The Tijdschrift voor Gerontologie en Geriatrie (English: Journal for Gerontology and Geriatrics) is a bimonthly peer-reviewed medical journal covering gerontology and geriatrics. It was established in 1970 as the Nederlands Tijdschrift voor Gerontologie and renamed Gerontologie in 1980 before obtaining its current name in 1982. It is published by Performis / Vilans.

Abstracting and indexing
The journal is abstracted and indexed in:
EBSCO databases
Embase
Index Medicus/MEDLINE/PubMed
ProQuest databases
PsycINFO
Scopus

References

External links

Dutch-language journals
Gerontology journals
Bimonthly journals
Publications established in 1970